The 2016–2017 Bryant Bulldogs men's basketball team represented Bryant University during the 2016–17 NCAA Division I men's basketball season. The team was led by ninth-year head coach Tim O'Shea and played their home games at the Chace Athletic Center in Smithfield, Rhode Island as members of the Northeast Conference. They finished the season 12–20, 9–9 in NEC play to finish in a three-way tie for fifth place. They lost in the quarterfinals of the NEC tournament to Saint Francis (PA).

Previous season 
The Bulldogs finished the 2015–16 season 8–23, 5–13 in NEC play to finish in ninth place. They failed to qualify for the NEC tournament.

Roster

Schedule and results

|-
!colspan=9 style=| Regular season

  

  
  

  

  
|-
!colspan=9 style=| NEC tournament

References

Bryant Bulldogs men's basketball seasons
Bryant
Bryant
Bryant